Mutia may refer to :

 Mutia (gens), a rather obscure plebeian family in Ancient Rome

 Places and jurisdictions
 Mutia, Africa, an Ancient city and former bishopric in the Roman Byzacena province, now in Tunisia and a Latin Catholic titular see
 Mutia, Zamboanga del Norte,a fifth class municipality in the province of Zamboanga del Norte on Mindanoa island, Philippines